Okonokos is a live album and concert film by the American band My Morning Jacket released on October 31, 2006. The album was recorded during the band's fall 2005 Z Tour, over two nights at The Fillmore in San Francisco, California. This is the first My Morning Jacket album for which frontman Jim James does not receive a production credit; he is credited for "concept/story".

Album track listing

CD

Disc one
 "Wordless Chorus" – 4:14
 "It Beats 4 U" – 4:26
 "Gideon" – 3:48
 "One Big Holiday" – 5:56
 "I Will Sing You Songs" – 8:38
 "Lowdown" – 4:14
 "The Way that He Sings" – 5:08
 "What a Wonderful Man" – 2:59
 "Off the Record" – 6:54
 "Golden" – 4:51
 "Lay Low" – 6:20

Disc two
 "Dondante" – 11:18
 "Run Thru" – 9:35
 "At Dawn" – 3:05
 "Xmas Curtain" – 5:02
 "O Is the One that Is Real" – 3:36
 "I Think I'm Going to Hell" – 5:16
 "Steam Engine" – 11:07
 "Dancefloors" – 5:15
 "Anytime" – 4:03
 "Mahgeetah" – 7:08

Vinyl box set

Record one
Side A:
 "Wordless Chorus"
 "It Beats 4 U"
 "Gideon"
 "One Big Holiday"
Side B:
 "I Will Sing You Songs"
 "Lowdown"
 "The Way that He Sings"

Record two
Side A:
 "At Dawn"
 "Golden"
 "What a Wonderful Man"
 "Off the Record"
Side B:
 "Lay Low"
 "Dondante"

Record three
Side A:
 "Run Thru"
 "Xmas Curtain"
 "O Is the One that Is Real"
Side B:
 "Steam Engine"
 "Dance Floors"

Record four
Side A: 
 "I Think I'm Going to Hell"
 "Anytime"
 "Mahgeetah"
Side B (bonus tracks):
 "Where to Begin"
 "Sooner"
 "Strangulation"

Concert film track listing
 "The Party"
 "Wordless Chorus"
 "It Beats 4 U"
 "Gideon"
 "One Big Holiday"
 "I Will Sing You Songs"
 "Lowdown"
 "The Way that He Sings"
 "What a Wonderful Man"
 "Off the Record"
 "Golden"
 "Lay Low"
 "Dondante"
 "Run Thru"
 "Xmas Curtain"
 "O Is the One that Is Real"
 "Steam Engine"
 "Anytime"
 "Mahgeetah"
 "The Attack"

Acoustic Chorale
Select versions of Okonokos released in 2006 at certain independent record stores included a bonus DVD with video of six tracks. Despite the title, only the first track is acoustic.
 "Bermuda Highway"
 "At Dawn"
 "Sooner"
 "Where to Begin"
 "I Think I'm Going to Hell"
 "Strangulation"

Personnel
My Morning Jacket
Carl Broemel – guitar, pedal steel guitar, saxophone, vocals
Patrick Hallahan – drums
Jim James – vocals, guitar
Bo Koster – keyboards, piano, percussion, looping, vocals
"Two-Tone" Tommy – bass guitar

Other
Bob Ludwig – mastering
Galea McGregor – production

References

External links
 
 Okonokos at IMDb

My Morning Jacket albums
My Morning Jacket live albums
2006 video albums
Live video albums
2006 live albums
My Morning Jacket video albums
ATO Records live albums
ATO Records video albums
Albums recorded at the Fillmore